Richard Young (September 7, 1843 – July 12, 1905) was a bishop in Rupert's Land. Young was born and educated in England. After being ordained as a priest in the Church of England in 1869, Young moved with his wife Julia Heurtley Harrison (1844-1934) to Winnipeg, Manitoba in 1875, where they started a family. In 1883 he became bishop of the see of Athabasca in present-day northern Alberta, the first Anglican bishop to be consecrated in western Canada. In 1903 he resigned as bishop due to ill health and returned to England, where he lived until his death in 1905.

One of his sons was Lieutenant Walter Young, a former pupil at Monkton Combe School, who was killed on 30 May 1908 in the Mohmand Expedition on the North West Frontier. Through his daughter Juliet Mary, Richard Young was the grandfather of the composer Walter Heurtley Braithwaite.

References
Biography at the Dictionary of Canadian Biography Online

1843 births
1905 deaths
19th-century Anglican Church of Canada bishops
Anglican bishops of Athabasca
20th-century Anglican Church of Canada bishops
Pre-Confederation Alberta people
People of Rupert's Land
British emigrants to pre-Confederation Canada